Cocos Lovers are a folk and roots band based in Deal, Kent. They are signed to Smugglers Records and have been described by The Independent as "Kent folk with an African twist".

References

External links
Official Website
Folk Radio UK Interview

English folk musicians